Tertremoides is an extinct genus of trematosaurian temnospondyl within the family Trematosauridae from Madagascar. It was first named by Lehman, J-P. in 1966 as Trematosaurus madagascariensis but renamed to Tertremoides ambilobensis by Lehman in 1979. Its closest relative was Trematolestes.

Below is a cladogram showing the phylogenetic position of Tertremoides, from Schoch (2006):

See also

 Prehistoric amphibian
 List of prehistoric amphibians

References

Early Triassic amphibians of Africa
Triassic temnospondyls of Africa
Prehistoric animals of Madagascar
Fossil taxa described in 1979